Commercial Valuers and Surveyors (CVS) provides business rent and rates services to occupiers of commercial property in the United Kingdom. CVS has a team of business rates surveyors who are experienced at successfully lodging business rates appeals at the Valuation Office Agency. The firm is headquartered in Manchester, and has offices in Old Trafford, Greater Manchester, City of London and Bristol.

Background
The company was founded in 1999 and is directed by Mark Rigby, the current CEO
. 
The firm has over 275  staff and a national network of chartered surveyors. CVS’ principal areas of practice include advice  and commentary on commercial property valuation, property tax and services.

Awards
’Highly commended’ for Estates Gazette's National Property Advisor of the Year 2014 
Ranked in the top 20 firms in the Property Week Agency Survey, 2014
'Finalist' for Estates Gazette's National Advisor of the Year 2015
'Finalist' for Property Week's 'Professional Agency Team of the Year' at the 2016 Property Awards
'Finalist' for Estates Gazette's Specialist Adviser of the Year 2017

Locations
The company currently operates from the following offices:

Oakland House, Talbot Road, Manchester
Woolgate Exchange, 25 Basinghall Street, London
Bull Wharf, Redcliff Street, Bristol

References

External links

Property companies of the United Kingdom